Ngga Pulu is a summit on the north rim of Mount Carstensz in the western part of the island of New Guinea rising . Trigonometric measurements showed that Ngga Pulu was (and had been for many centuries before) the highest mountain of New Guinea and also the highest summit of the Australia-New Guinea continent. However, due to glacial melting, Ngga Pulu lost a lot of elevation in the 20th century.

Name
Ngga Pulu is the only summit of Mount Carstensz with a regular indigenous name. Sumantri and the current summit used to be called the NW and SE peaks of Ngga Pulu. Heinrich Harrer labeled the NW peak Ngapalu on his map drawn in 1962, while calling the SE Peak (the current Ngga Pulu) Sunday Peak. Sometime after 1973 the NW summit was renamed to Sumantri, in honor of the recently deceased Minister of Energy and Mineral Resources.

Climbing history
Anton Colijn, Jean Jacques Dozy and Frits Wissel reached the summit on 5 December 1936 during the Carstensz Expedition over the Northwall Firn. Subsequent ascendants were Heinrich Harrer and company in 1962 and a Japanese-Indonesian expedition in 1964..

Loss of elevation and ice 
By the year 2000, all New Guinea glaciers outside the Carstensz area had disappeared. Inside the Carstensz area, a former sub-peak, the now rocky summit of Sumantri, is now some meters higher than the still ice-covered Ngga Pulu. The glacial melting has produced significant elevation changes for prominence key cols in the inner Carstensz area and it is also probable that other former big ice-capped peaks in New Guinea lost various meters in elevation such as Puncak Mandala, East Carstensz Top and Ngga Pilimsit. Scientists are monitoring the glacial retreat and estimate that by about 2020–2030, all New Guinea glaciers may disappear.

See also 
 List of highest mountains of New Guinea

References

Sources 
 "Ngga Pulu, Indonesia" on Peakbagger

Mountains of Indonesia
Four-thousanders of New Guinea